Tyler John Matakevich (born December 22, 1992) is an American football linebacker for the Buffalo Bills of the National Football League (NFL). He played college football at Temple. He was drafted by the Pittsburgh Steelers in the seventh round (246th overall) in the 2016 NFL Draft.

Early years
Matakevich attended St. Joseph High School in Trumbull, Connecticut. He played linebacker and running back on the football team and also played baseball. He finished his high school career with 2,357 yards rushing, 1,355 yards receiving, 3,898 all-purpose yards on offense, and 371 tackles, 4.5 sacks, three forced fumbles, six fumble recoveries, and eight interceptions on defense. Over the course of his career, he scored 59 total touchdowns. During a pre-season scrimmage his senior year he broke his foot and wound up missing five games, therefore after high school graduation he attended Milford Academy. After one year at Milford Academy, Matakevich committed to Temple University to play college football.

College career
As a freshman at Temple in 2012, Matakevich played in all 13 games, making his first start in Week 5 against USF. He became the first freshman in school history to record 100 tackles, finishing with 101. As a sophomore, he had 137 tackles, one sack and one interception. As a junior, he had 117 tackles, 1.5 sacks and one interception. During his senior year, he became the seventh player in FBS history to record 100 tackles all four years. Leading Temple to the inaugural AAC Championship during his final year of eligibility, Matakevich received national honors including the AAC Defensive Player of the Year, the Bronko Nagurski Trophy and the Chuck Bednarik Award. All three were firsts for Temple football. He also became Temple's third consensus All-American. During the 2015 Boca Raton Bowl, he broke the school's record for career tackles, finishing with 493. For the season he had 138 tackles, 4.5 sacks and five interceptions.

Professional career

Pittsburgh Steelers 
The Pittsburgh Steelers selected Matakevich in the seventh round (246th overall) of the 2016 NFL Draft. He said, at the time of receiving the call from head coach Mike Tomlin, he was in the process of speaking to other teams about being signed as a priority undrafted free-agent. The Steelers said they selected him because he was their highest rated player on their big board at the time.

2016
On May 5, 2016, the Pittsburgh Steelers signed Matakevich to a four-year, $2.40 million rookie contract that includes a signing bonus of $63,502.

Throughout training camp, he competed for a roster spot against veteran Steven Johnson, L. J. Fort, and Travis Feeney. He impressed coaches and showed consistent play in the preseason. Head coach Mike Tomlin named him the backup inside linebacker to Ryan Shazier to start the regular season.

He made his professional regular season debut in the Steelers' season-opening 38–16 victory over the Washington Redskins. The next game, he made his first career tackle in a 24–16 win over the Cincinnati Bengals. On November 6, 2016, he recorded a season-high nine combined tackles in a 30–15 loss to the Miami Dolphins. In the Week 16 match-up against the Baltimore Ravens, he recorded two solo tackles in a 32–27 victory. He finished his rookie season with 20 combined tackles in 16 games. The Pittsburgh Steelers finished the  season first in the AFC North with an 11–5 record and received a playoff berth. On January 8, 2017, Matakevich played in his first career playoff game as the Steelers defeated the Miami Dolphins 30–12 in the AFC Wildcard game.

2017
He returned to training camp in 2017 and competed to a roster spot against Steven Johnson, L.J. Fort, Travis Feeney, Kevin Anderson, Matt Galambos, and Keith Kelsey. He was named backup inside linebacker to Ryan Shazier and Vince Williams to start the season.

On September 10, 2017, Matakevich blocked a punt by Browns' punter Britton Colquitt during the Pittsburgh Steelers' season-opening 21–18 victory over the Cleveland Browns. Teammate Anthony Chickillo recovered the ball in the end zone for a touchdown and made the first score of the Steelers' season. On October 15, 2017, Matakevich recorded four combined tackles in the Steelers' 19–13 victory at the Kansas City Chiefs. On December 4, 2017, he collected a season-high six combined tackles in a 23–20 victory at the Cincinnati Bengals. Matakevich finished the season with 23 combined tackles (18 solo) and a pass deflection in 15 games and zero starts.

Buffalo Bills
On March 30, 2020, Matakevich signed a two-year contract with the Buffalo Bills.

On March 16, 2021, Matakevich signed a one-year extension through the 2022 season.

On March 13, 2023, Matakevich signed a two-year extension.

NFL career statistics

Regular season

Postseason

References

External links
Temple Owls bio
Stats at Yahoo.com

1992 births
Living people
All-American college football players
American football linebackers
American people of Slavic descent
Buffalo Bills players
Milford Academy alumni
People from Stratford, Connecticut
Pittsburgh Steelers players
Players of American football from Connecticut
Sportspeople from Fairfield County, Connecticut
Temple Owls football players